Nicotinic acid hydroxylase may refer to:

 Nicotinate dehydrogenase (cytochrome)
 Nicotinate dehydrogenase